Greatest Hits is the 2006 collection of the Divinyls music since their career lifted off in the early 1980s. This album was inspired by the Divinyls' entry into the 2006 ARIA Hall of Fame. This album also marks their 25 years in music. It features some of their biggest hits including "Boys in Town", "Pleasure and Pain" and their #1 hit "I Touch Myself".

It is their only compilation album to feature tracks from all five of the group’s studio albums.

Track listing
 "Boys in Town" - 2:50
 "Science Fiction" - 3:32
 "Siren (Never Let You Go)" - 2:28
 "Only Lonely" - 3:15
 "Casual Encounter" - 3:05
 "Good Die Young" - 3:36
 "In My Life" - 3:43
 "Pleasure and Pain" - 3:55
 "Sleeping Beauty" - 3:38
 "Temperamental" - 4:30
 "Back to the Wall" - 4:38
 "Hey Little Boy" - 3:21
 "Punxsie" - 4:16
 "I Touch Myself" - 3:46
 "Love School" - 5:23
 "Make Out Alright" - 4:38
 "I'm On Your Side" - 4:16
 "I Ain't Gonna Eat Out My Heart Anymore" - 4:30
 "I'm Jealous" - 4:16
 "Human On the Inside" - 4:12

Charts

References

Divinyls compilation albums
2006 greatest hits albums
EMI Records compilation albums